George Lunt (December 31, 1803 – May 17, 1885) was an American editor, lawyer, author, and politician. George's ancestor, Henry Lunt, was one of the original settlers of Newbury (1635). His grandfather's exploits with John Paul Jones were chronicled by James Fenimore Cooper.

Life
George Lunt was born in Newburyport, Massachusetts on December 31, 1803. He attended Phillips Exeter Academy.  He was graduated at Harvard College in 1824, with special distinction in Greek, studied law, and began practice in Newburyport in 1827.

In earlier life, Mr. Lunt was an active member of the Whig party, and in its interests was distinguished as a public speaker. On the dissolution of that party he became a Democrat.
He was elected successively representative for Newburyport and senator from Essex County in the legislature, was an active member of the convention that nominated General Zachary Taylor for the presidency, and was appointed United States District Attorney for Massachusetts under Taylor's administration. He eventually resumed the private practice of his profession, devoting his leisure to literary pursuits. When the Whigs dissolved, he joined the Democrats.

Prior to and during the Civil War he was editor of the Boston Courier in conjunction with George S. Hillard. He opposed policies which would estrange the South and defended slavery. When he returned to the practice of his profession, he appeared frequently in the state courts, and was counsel before congressional committees in reference to French claims, preparing a bill and efficiently pressing it for the action of congress. Mr. Lunt's later years were marked by labors in behalf of harbors of refuge, notably at Scituate, Massachusetts, on the south shore of Boston bay. By persevering effort he succeeded in securing very considerable appropriations from congress to this end.  He was a man of firm convictions in both political and religious matters, and fearless and manly in their expression. As a writer his style was marked by strength, dignity, and grace.

Lunt died in Boston on May 17, 1885.

Works
 "Poems" (New York, 1839)
  The Age of Gold (Boston, 1843)
 The Dove and the Eagle (1851)
 Lyric Poems (1854)
 Julia (1855)
  Eastford, or Household Sketches (1855)
 
 "Radicalism in Religion, Philosophy, and Social Life" (1858)
  The Union, a Poem (1860)
 
 Origin of the Late War (New York, 1866)
 
  Poems (1884).

Notes

References

External links
 
 
 In 1879 Henry Tucker wrote the song, "Mabel " using the lyrics from Mr. Lunt's poem At the Gate.

1803 births
1885 deaths
19th-century American male writers
19th-century American politicians
19th-century American poets
American editors
American male poets
Harvard College alumni
Members of the Massachusetts House of Representatives
Massachusetts state senators
Politicians from Newburyport, Massachusetts
Writers from Newburyport, Massachusetts
United States Attorneys for the District of Massachusetts
19th-century American lawyers